Jaime Canalejo Pazos (born 25 November 1991) is a Spanish rower. He competed in the 2020 Summer Olympics.

Notes

References

External links

1991 births
Living people
Sportspeople from Seville
Rowers at the 2020 Summer Olympics
Spanish male rowers
Olympic rowers of Spain
World Rowing Championships medalists for Spain
21st-century Spanish people